Wiesław Łukaszeski (born 1941) is one of Poland's leading psychologists, specializing in personality psychology, social psychology, psychology of motivation. Professor at Szkoła Wyższa Psychologii Społecznej in Wrocław and Sopot, assistant professor.

In 1964 he graduated from the University of Warsaw, in 1972 did his doctoral dissertation and became an assistant professor in 1974. Since 1987 he is a professor of humanistic science.

He used to lecture at Dolnośląska Szkoła Wyższa Edukacji Towarzystwa Wiedzy Powszechnej in Wrocław, University of Wrocław (Department of Historical and Pedagogical Science), University of Opole (Historical-Pedagogical Department, Institute of Psychology). He is a member of Polish Academy of Science (PAN), since 1994 serves as the Chairman of the Committee of Psychological Sciences PAN. Member of the editorial board of scientific journals: Psychological Journal, Psychological Review and Quarterly Journal of Developmental Psychology; cooperates with the editor of the monthly Charaktery.

Major books
 Ocena działania a wykonywanie nowych zadań, publisher Ossolineum, Wrocław 1970
 Osobowość: Struktura i funkcje regulacyjne, Wydawnictwo Naukowe PWN, Warszawa 1974
 Struktura ja a działanie w sytuacjach zadaniowych. Empiryczne studium nad funkcjami regulacyjnymi osobowości, publisher UWR, Wrocław 1982
 Szanse rozwoju osobowości, publisher KIW, Warszawa 1984
 Wielkie pytania psychologii, Gdańskie Wydawnictwo Psychologiczne, Gdańsk 2003 (winner of the Special Prize of the Minister of Science and Information Technology for academic books) 
 Wytrwałość w działaniu (with Magdalena Marszał Wiśniewska), Gdańskie Wydawnictwo Psychologiczne, Gdańsk 2006

References

Living people
1941 births
Polish psychologists